Dasht-e Shur (also Romanized as Dasht-e Shūr, Dasht-i-Shūr, and Dasht Shūr) is a village in Efzar Rural District, Efzar District, Qir and Karzin County, Fars Province, Iran. At the 2006 census, its population was 601, in 118 families.

References 

Populated places in Qir and Karzin County